Pyotr Nikolaevich Meshchaninov (Russian: Пётр Николаевич Мещани́нов, 9 July 1944 – 18 November 2006) was a Russian pianist and conductor specialized in Russian contemporary music. He premiered Sofia Gubaidulina's  in 1976, and her 1981 Descensio was dedicated to him.

References

Russian classical pianists
Male classical pianists
1944 births
2006 deaths
20th-century Russian conductors (music)
Russian male conductors (music)
20th-century Russian male musicians
20th-century classical pianists